Ángel Hernández may refer to:

 Ángel Hernández (umpire) (born 1961), Major League Baseball umpire
 Ángel Hernández (long jumper) (born 1966), Spanish athlete
 Ángel Hernández (boxer) (born 1975), Mexican light middleweight boxer
 Ángel Guillermo Heredia Hernández (born 1975), Mexican sports coach and former discus thrower
 Ángel Cedillo Hernández (born 1960), Mexican politician 
 Ángel García Hernández (1899–1930), Spanish soldier
 Ángel Hernández (gymnast) (born 1995), Colombian gymnast